Events in the year 1860 in India.

Incumbents
Charles Canning

Events
National income - ₹4,100 million
A new treaty between the Nizam of Hyderabad (a loyal ally during the rebellion of 1857) and the British.

Law
Societies Registration Act
Indian Penal Code
Indian Securities Act (British statute)
Admiralty Jurisdiction (India) Act
Admiralty Offences (Colonial) Act (British statute)
Superannuation Act (British statute)
East India Loan Act (British statute)
East India Stock Act (British statute)

Births
10 August – Vishnu Narayan Bhatkhande, Indian classical musician (died 1936).

References

 
India
Years of the 19th century in India